Chaaver is an upcoming Indian Malayalam language action thriller film directed by Tinu Pappachan and written by Joy Methew. It is produced by Arun Narayan and Venu Kunnapilly. The film stars Kunchacko Boban, Antony Varghese  and Arjun Ashokan  in lead roles. It is scheduled to theatrically released in April 2023.

Cast 

 Kunchacko Boban
 Antony Varghese
 Arjun Ashokan

Production 
Chaveer is the third film of director Tinu Pappachan, who won critical appreciation for films Swathanthryam Ardharathriyil and Ajagajantaram. The film is produced by Arun Narayanan and Venu Kunnapilly under the banner of Arun Narayanan Productions and Kavya Films.

Release 
The teaser of the film was released on 28 January 2023 on YouTube. Chaaver is scheduled to be theatrically released on 2023.

References

External links 

 

Upcoming films
Malayalam cinema